Besh-Ozyok (Beş-Özök) is a rural locality (a selo) and the administrative centre of Besh-Ozyokskoye Rural Settlement of Shebalinsky District, the Altai Republic, Russia. The population was 577 as of 2016. There are 8 streets.

Geography 
Besh-Ozyok is located 114 km southwest of Shebalino (the district's administrative centre) by road. Shyrgaytu is the nearest rural locality.

References 

Rural localities in Shebalinsky District